Ezra–Nehemiah is a book in the Hebrew Bible found in the Ketuvim section, originally with the Hebrew title of Ezra. The book covers the period from the fall of Babylon in 539 BCE to the second half of the 5th century BCE, and tells of the successive missions to Jerusalem of Zerubbabel, Ezra, and Nehemiah, and their efforts to restore the worship of the God of Israel and to create a purified Jewish community. It is the only part of the Bible which narrates the Persian period of biblical history.

Historical background
In the early 6th century Judah rebelled against Babylon and was destroyed (586 BCE). The royal court and the priests, prophets and scribes were taken into captivity in Babylon. There the exiles blamed their fate on disobedience to God and looked forward to a future when a penitent and purified people would be allowed to return to Jerusalem and rebuild the Temple. (These ideas are expressed in the prophets Jeremiah (although he was not exiled to Babylon), Isaiah, and, especially, Ezekiel). The same period saw the rapid rise of Persia, previously an unimportant kingdom in present-day southern Iran, and in 539 BCE Cyrus the Great, the Persian ruler, conquered Babylon.

Composition
In the 19th century and for much of the 20th, it was believed that Chronicles and Ezra–Nehemiah came from the same author or circle of authors (similar to the traditional view which held Ezra to be the author of all three), but the usual view among modern scholars is that the differences between Chronicles and Ezra–Nehemiah are greater than the similarities, and that Ezra–Nehemiah itself had a long history of composition from many sources, stretching from the early 4th century down to the Hellenistic period.

The accepted view throughout the 19th century and for much of the 20th was that Chronicles and Ezra–Nehemiah made up a single "Chronicler's History" by an anonymous "Chronicler". This consensus was challenged in the late 1960s in an important article by Sara Japhet, and today three positions dominate discussion: first, an affirmation that a Chronicler's History existed and included all or part of Ezra–Nehemiah; second, a denial that Chronicles and Ezra–Nehemiah were ever combined; and third, the suggestion that the two were by the same author but written at different times and issued as separate works. Of the three, it is generally accepted that Ezra–Nehemiah forms a unified work separate from Chronicles: the many scholars who agree on this include H. G. M. Williamson, Sara Japhet, and Gary Knoppers.
H. G. M. Williamson (1987) sees three basic stages to the composition of Ezra–Nehemiah: (1) composition of the various lists and Persian documents, which he accepts as authentic and therefore the earliest parts of the book; (2) composition of the "Ezra memoir" and "Nehemiah memoir", about 400 BCE; and (3), composition of Ezra 1–6 (the story of Zerubabbel) as the final editor's introduction to the combined earlier texts, about 300 BCE.

More recently Juha Pakkala (2004) has carried out an extensive analysis of the layers in Ezra. He sees the account of the rebuilding of the Temple (Ezra 5:1–6:15) and the core of the "Ezra memoir" (Ezra 7–10/Nehemiah 8) developing separately until they were combined by an editor who wished to show how Temple and Torah were re-introduced into Judah after the exile. This editor also added Ezra 1–5. The combined text was then further developed by priestly circles who stressed Temple over Torah, transformed Ezra from scribe to priest, and stressed the primacy of the Babylonian returnees over those who had remained in the land, a distinction that had not appeared in the original Ezra material. Still later, Levitical editors combined Ezra and Nehemiah to produce the final form of the book, reintroducing interest in Torah and stressing the primacy of the Levites.

Jacob Wright (2004) has carried out similar work on Nehemiah. According to his study the original "Nehemiah memoir" was an account of the rebuilding of the city walls. Successive layers were then added to this, turning the building report into an account of Judah's restoration and depicting Nehemiah as a Persian governor who reforms the community of Israel. Finally, after Ezra had come into existence through the combination of Ezra 1–6 with Ezra 7–10, the accounts of the repopulation and dedication of the city and the friction between Temple and torah were added to produce the final book of Nehemiah. Furthermore, in Wright's article his main issue is of course the literature of the text. The argument comes when Nehemiah notices that the Judeans were marrying people outside of their lands (exogamy) whose children spoke the same language. Although this came during the 52 days of the construction of the wall, we are not sure how he noticed the issue. The non clarity in the text according to Wright is as if Ezra already outlawed Judean men not to marry any one outside of their land, then why is Nehemiah noticing it thirteen years later. According to Wright the issue in Ezra 9–10 is in the verse 24, where it says that half of the children spoke another language and did not know the language of Judah. Even though the issue in the text says it is not worried about the survival of the Judean language Nehemiah cannot endorse the exogamous marriage. After punishing the men, that is when he makes them take the oath however Wright's argument is if Nehemiah actually composed that text, in which he did not know a passage in Deuteronomy, then why does he compose an oath that does not match the issue that was in the previous verse.

Lester Grabbe (2003), based on various factors including the type of Aramaic used in the youngest sections and the ignorance of Ezra–Nehemiah as a single book displayed by other Hellenistic Jewish writers, suggests that the two texts were combined, with some final editing, in the Ptolemaic period, c. 300c. 200 BCE.

Textual history
The Hebrew Ezra–Nehemiah was translated into Greek by the mid-2nd century BCE. The Greek and Roman rendering of Ezra's name is Esdras, and there are two versions of the Greek Ezra–Nehemiah, Esdras alpha (Ἔσδρας Αʹ) and Esdras beta (Ἔσδρας Βʹ). Esdras beta, which is still used in churches of the Greek-speaking and other Orthodox Christian traditions, is close to the standard Hebrew version, but Esdras alpha (or 1 Esdras) is very different: it reproduces only the material that pertains to Ezra, and ignores Nehemiah; while including additional material in the form of the 'Tale of the Three Guardsmen' (1 Esdras 3:4 to 4:4). When Early Christian authors cite the 'Book of Ezra" it is always 'Esdras alpha' to which they refer. 'Esdras beta' (Ezra–Nehemiah) supplemented 'Esdras alpha' in Christian bibles from the 4th century onwards, but appears rarely to have been read as scripture; and only the 'Nehemiah' sections are ever cited in patristic texts. The earliest Christian commentary on Ezra–Nehemiah is that of Bede in the early 8th century.

The fact that Ezra–Nehemiah was translated into Greek by the mid-2nd century BCE suggests that this was the time by which it had come to be regarded as scripture. It was treated as a single book in the Hebrew, Greek and Old Latin manuscripts. The duplication of translations of Ezra was rejected by Jerome in his Latin Vulgate translation, who did not translate 'Esdras alpha'. In later medieval manuscripts of the Vulgate, especially the Paris Bibles of the 13th century onwards, the single book of Ezra (corresponding to Ezra–Nehemiah) is increasingly split in two, so that the two-books tradition became fixed in the Western church. Jewish bibles continued to treat as a single work, with the title "Ezra," until the 15th century AD, but modern Hebrew bibles still print the Masoretic notes at the end of Nehemiah listing the middle verse as Nehemiah 3:32, indicating that a complete work of Ezra–Nehemiah is in view. (To confuse the matter further there are other quite distinct works in the name of Esdras, largely dealing with visions and prophecies.)

The Masoretic Text of Ezra–Nehemiah is largely in Late Biblical Hebrew, with significant sections in Biblical Aramaic there are occasional reflections of Old Persian vocabulary, but little significant influence from Greek.

Summary and structure

Ezra 1 (the Edict of Cyrus) and Ezra 2 (the list of returnees) are presented as Persian documents; Ezra 3–6, which contains further supposed Persian documents mixed with third-person narrative, may be based on the prophetic works of Haggai and Zechariah, who were active at the time; Ezra 7–10, partly in the first-person, is sometimes called the "Ezra Memoir", but has been so heavily edited that the source, if it exists, is very difficult to recover. There is widespread agreement that a genuine memoir underlies Nehemiah, although it has clearly been edited. It can be no earlier than about 400 BCE, but is probably later, possibly even as late as 336–331 BCE (the reign of Darius III, the last Persian king); it probably circulated as an independent document before being combined with Ezra.

There are seven Persian documents embedded in Ezra–Nehemiah, six in Ezra and one in Nehemiah. All but one are in Aramaic language, the administrative language of the Persian empire. Many scholars accept these as genuine, but a study by Lester Grabbe indicates that while genuine Persian documents may underlie a number of them, they have been reworked to fit the purposes of later writers.

The narrative is highly schematic, each stage of the restoration following the same pattern: God "stirs up" the Persian king, the king commissions a Jewish leader to undertake a task, the leader overcomes opposition and succeeds, and success is marked by a great assembly.

Ezra–Nehemiah is made up of three stories: (1) the account of the initial return and rebuilding of the Temple (Ezra 1–6); (2) the story of Ezra's mission (Ezra 7–10 and Nehemiah 8); (3) and the story of Nehemiah, interrupted by a collection of miscellaneous lists and part of the story of Ezra.

Ezra 1–6
God moves the heart of Cyrus to commission Sheshbazzar (whose other name is Zerubbabel) "the prince of Judah", to rebuild the Temple; 40,000 exiles return to Jerusalem led by Zerubbabel and Joshua the high priest. There they overcome the opposition of their enemies to rebuild the altar and lay the foundations of the Temple. The Samaritans, who are their enemies, force work to be suspended, but in the reign of Darius the decree of Cyrus is rediscovered, the Temple is completed, and the people celebrate the feast of Passover.

Ezra 7–10
God moves king Artaxerxes to commission Ezra the priest and scribe to return to Jerusalem and teach the laws of God to any who do not know them. Ezra leads a large body of exiles back to the holy city, where he discovers that Jewish men have been marrying non-Jewish women. He tears his garments in despair and confesses the sins of Israel before God, then braves the opposition of some of his own countrymen to purify the community by dissolving the sinful marriages.

Nehemiah 1–6
Nehemiah, cup-bearer to king Artaxerxes, is informed that Jerusalem remains without walls. He prays to God, recalling the sins of Israel and God's promise of restoration in the land. Artaxerxes commissions him to return to Jerusalem as governor, where he defies the opposition of Judah's enemies on all sides—Samaritans, Ammonites, Arabs and Philistines—to rebuild the walls. He enforces the cancellation of debts among the Jews, and rules with justice and righteousness.

Nehemiah 7–10
The list of those who returned with Zerubbabel is discovered. Ezra reads the law of Moses to the people and the people celebrate the Feast of Tabernacles for seven days; on the eighth they assemble in sackcloth and penitence to recall the past sins which led to the destruction of Jerusalem and the enslavement of the Jews, and enter into a covenant to keep the law and separate themselves from all other peoples.

Nehemiah 11–13
Nehemiah takes measures to repopulate the city and returns to Susa after 12 years in Jerusalem. After some time in Susa he returns, only to find that the people have broken the covenant. He enforces the covenant and prays to God for his favour.

Themes
The Mercer Bible Dictionary notes three notable theological themes in Ezra and Nehemiah: God's use of foreign rulers for Israel's sake; opposition to Israel from foreign neighbours; and the need to separate Israel from foreign neighbours to preserve the purity of the people of God. In the last half of Nehemiah the emphasis shifts to the joint role of Ezra and Nehemiah in instructing the people in the Law and in the dedication of the wall, these two activities together forming the reconstitution of Jewish life in Jerusalem; Dillard and Longman describe this as the moment when "the whole city becomes holy ground."

Division into Ezra and Nehemiah
The single Hebrew book "Ezra–Nehemiah", with the title "Ezra", was translated into Greek around the middle of the 2nd century BCE. Slightly later a second, and very different, Greek translation was made, commonly referred to as 1 Esdras. The Septuagint includes both 1 Esdras and the older translation of Ezra–Nehemiah, and names the two books as Esdras A and Esdras B respectively. The early Christian scholar Origen remarked that the Hebrew 'book of Ezra' might then be considered a 'double' book. Jerome, writing in the early 5th century, noted that this duplication had since been adopted by Greek and Latin Christians. Jerome himself rejected the duplication in his Vulgate translation of the Bible into Latin from the Hebrew; and consequently all early Vulgate manuscripts present Ezra–Nehemiah as a single book, as too does the 8th century commentary of Bede, and in the 9th century bibles of Alcuin and Theodulf of Orleans. However, from the 9th century onwards, Latin bibles are found that for the first time separate the Ezra and Nehemiah sections of Ezra–Nehemiah as two distinct books; and this became standard in the Paris Bibles of the 13th century. It was not until 1516/17, in the first printed Rabbinic Bible of Daniel Bomberg that the separation was introduced generally in Hebrew Bibles.

Questions

Chronological order of Ezra and Nehemiah
The order of the two figures, Ezra and Nehemiah, is perhaps the most debated issue regarding the book. Ezra 7:8 records that Ezra arrived in Jerusalem in the seventh year of king Artaxerxes, while Nehemiah 2#Verses 1–8:1–9 has Nehemiah arriving in Artaxerxes' twentieth year. If this was Artaxerxes I (465–424 BCE), then Ezra arrived in 458 and Nehemiah in 445 BCE. Nehemiah 8–9, in which the two (possibly by editorial error) appear together, supports this scenario.

In 1890, however, it was proposed that Ezra's Artaxerxes was Artaxerxes II, and that the sequence should be reversed, with Nehemiah arriving in 445 and Ezra in 398 BCE. The argument has some persuasive evidence; for example: Nehemiah's mission is to rebuild the walls of Jerusalem, and Ezra 9:9 notes that Ezra found the walls in place when he arrived, and while Nehemiah lists the returnees who came back with Zerubbabel he seems to know nothing about the 5,000 or so who accompanied Ezra. Nevertheless, there are counter-arguments to each of these and other arguments, and the 398 date has not replaced the traditional one. A proposal that the reference to the "seventh year" of Artaxerxes (Ezra 7:7–8) should be read as "thirty-seventh year", putting Ezra's return in 428 BCE, has not won support.

Expulsion of the Gentiles in Ezra–Nehemiah
Hayes, in her article on impurity in Ancient Jewish society, states that it is commonly misconceived that the expulsion of the Gentile wives was a result of Judaean exceptionalism and nationalism. Hayes points out that the theory is not correct arguing that the root cause is largely a fundamental and core belief found within the religious laws of the Judaeans. Ezra, Hayes explains, imagined Israel as divinely ordained to remain pure and holy, set apart and without the influence of other nations in Canaan, just as the Priestly division were commanded, by God, to practice marriage exclusivity. In reaction to contemporaries, such as Hayes and Klawans, who argue that Ezra–Nehemiah's purity ideology is a product of conservative "ritual" and "moral" purity, independently; Olyan claims that Ezra–Nehemiah's alien expulsion mandate was a result of a melding ideology taken from the two seemingly independent ideas of, "moral" and "ritual" purity and remains exclusive to the particular narrative of Ezra–Nehemiah. Moral purity has familial implications, which the lack of may cause disruption in the cohesiveness of the family unit. Transgressing Israelite moral structure was feared to cause violations of the commandments, which ordained by God, must be followed to maintain ethnical identity. The influence of gentile women and culture upon Israelite men and posterity, through the eyes of ancient Judaean Priests, could turn Yahweh worshippers towards foreign deities and hedonism. Ritual purity stresses the importance of keeping to sacred practices dictated by revered predecessors and the Holy Scriptures. Olyan believes that Ezra's expulsion of the gentiles could also be linked with the idea that outside lineage would initially pollute the priestly bloodline, acting as an apparatus to destroy "right" ritual practice.

Another scholar, Paul Heger, takes a different stance on the expulsion of the Gentiles in Ezra–Nehemiah. According to Heger, Ezra's motive for expelling Gentile women and their offspring was because at the time leaders believed that the identity of the Israelites did not depend of the ethnicity of their mothers, but depended on the seed of their fathers. The motive behind prohibiting intermarriage with all Gentile women was due to the danger of assimilation resulting from the influence of social interaction with the surrounding nations. The expulsion of the foreign women and their offspring was directed in order to preserve the purity of the Israelite "holy seed". Thus, Ezra did not introduce the idea of matrilineal identity.

Katherine Southwood emphasizes that Ezra and Nehemiah are similar in their views of intermarriage in that both Ezra and Nehemiah allude to the Deuteronomic text in their narratives, and believe intermarriage to be a type of transgression. There are other similar nuances that lead some scholars to believe that they are from a similar source. However, there are also differences in the two sources that should not be forgotten. Firstly, the intermarriage debate is between different classes of people, each of which is trying to reserve their sense of ethnicity. Ezra argues that marriage with non-exilic Jews is a transgression, and Nehemiah emphasizes that marriage to non-Jews is a sin. Even though this book says specific groups, the book of Ezra prohibits all exogamy. According to Christine Hayes, Ezra is concerned about the holy seed being profaned since he believes God has chosen his people as being holy. Since anyone that is not inside of the chosen group is considered not holy, it would be sinful to marry and reproduce with them, according to Ezra. Scholars also believe that there were further political reasons behind Nehemiah's protest against intermarriage, and Ezra had a variety of different reasons. In either case, these two viewpoints on intermarriage with exogamous groups have differences, but ultimately, each is trying to promote and protect the ethnicity of their own group.

Southwood goes on to discuss that both Ezra and Nehemiah display a "consciousness of ethnicity', though Southwood focuses primarily on Nehemiah's case, and the importance of the relationship between ethnicity and language. In Nehemiah specifically, the women that the Jews have married are named specifically as from 'Ashod, Ammon, and Moab' (Neh. 13:23). The concern is then expressed that the Ashodites were connected to Nehemiah's statement of outrage when he says that 'half of their children spoke the language of Ashod... and they were not able to speak the language of Judah' (Neh. 13:24). There is some debate as to how different the language of Ashod was from the Hebrew. However, if the languages were similar, according to Southwood, the problem at stake would be the purity of the language. If this were an entirely different language altogether, the purity of the language would be concern, as well as the concern for the threat of the extinction of the Hebrew language. In either case, the religious and ethnic identity that is encapsuled with the Hebrew language was being put at stake. Southwood makes the point that Nehemiah's objection to intermarriage with foreign women, especially those aforementioned, relates to language being the symbol of ethnicity; therefore, it is not the language itself that is the problem, but rather the preservation of language is a "symptom of deeper concern about protecting ethnic identity." Thus, Southwood holds that both Ezra and Nehemiah are concerned about the legitimacy of their groups in relation to the experience of the exile, though Nehemiah's concern specifically emphasizes language as a potential means by which ethnicity seemed to be defined.

Southwood makes some points in her article in how the terms "race", "ethnicity", and "nationalism" can be used in translations of Ezra 9–10. She points out that there are multiple problems not only inside the text but in work of the scholars as well. Although it is evident that the terms "ethnicity" and "race" have similarities, one is just a secondary term of another. This however does not make the text easily translated and makes the expression of those terms as Southwood puts it not "appropriate" on any level. She argues that the text focuses on the distinction between the "people of the land" and the "Holy seed", rather than on physical difference such as skin and hair color, which in any case do not really differ between these two populations. Thus the term "ethnicity" may be best in relation to the people in general, but in relation to intermarriage Southwood feels that "nationalism" and "ethnicity" both do justice. She claims that the term "race" is not needed and is used in a negative manner.

Like Southwood, Hayes also talks about the "holy seed."  According to Hayes, Ezra and Nehemiah appear to promote the ban of intermarriage with all Gentiles. According to Hayes, Ezra is not a racial ideology that is concerned with purity of blood, but rather a religious notion of Israel as a "holy seed". With intermarriage the holy seed of Israel becomes mixed with the profane seed. In other words, intermarriage violates the holy seed of Abraham and Israel.

Sheshbazzar and Zerubbabel
Ezra begins with Cyrus entrusting the Temple vessels to Sheshbazzar, "prince of Judah"; this apparently important figure then disappears from the story almost entirely, and Zerubbabel is abruptly introduced as the main figure. Both are called governors of Judah and are both credited with laying the foundation of the Temple. A number of explanations have been proposed, including: (1) the two are the same person; (2) Sheshbazzar was in fact Shenazzar, Zerubabbel's uncle (mentioned in Chronicles); (3) Sheshbazzar began the work and Zerubbabel finished it.

The "law-book of Moses" read by Ezra

Ezra's mission according to Nehemiah 8 was to apply "the law of Moses" in Jerusalem, which he does by reading a "book of the law of Moses" (a "scroll" in Hebrew) in a marathon public session: the question is, what was this law-book? Some scholars have suggested it was some form of Deuteronomy, since Ezra's laws are heavily skewed towards that book; others have proposed that it was the "Priestly Writing", which probably dates from the Persian period; a third suggestion, and most popular, is that it was a form of the Torah, as it was clearly associated with Moses and contained both Deuteronomistic and Priestly elements; and the fourth view is that Ezra's law-book is lost to us and cannot be recovered.

See also
Esdras, for a description of conflicting numbering schemes of books of Esdras
1 Esdras – the variant text of Chronicles–Ezra–Nehemiah

References

External links
Commentaries on Ezra–Nehemiah

Other

Translations
Bible Gateway (opens at NIV version)

 
Ketuvim
Historical books
Achaemenid Empire
Works attributed to the Chronicler